Drepatelodes trilineata is a moth in the Apatelodidae family. It was described by Paul Dognin in 1912.

References

Natural History Museum Lepidoptera generic names catalog

Apatelodidae
Moths described in 1912